The Durham County Football Association (also simply known as the Durham FA) is the governing body of football in the historic county of Durham. The Durham FA was founded on 25 March 1883 and is the governing body for football in Durham from grass roots to professional level. They also run a number of cups for teams of all levels across the county, leagues for under-18, under-21 and ladies teams, and an under-18 representative team.

History

In 1879 the joint Durham and Northumberland Football Association was founded and they stayed that way until 1883 when increasing numbers and travel problems for the clubs necessitated a change. On 11 May 1883, 40 clubs met in the Alexandra Hotel in Newcastle and voted to form an independent body known as the Northumberland Football Association.  The Durham clubs followed suit holding a meeting at the Three Tuns Hotel, Durham City, on 25 May 1883. The nine clubs who were represented at that meeting formed the Durham County Football Association.

In its second season 18 clubs took part in the Durham Challenge Cup, the only county cup competition in the country at that time. On the 125 year anniversary in 2007–08, the association organised 11 county cup competitions at various levels and a total of 988 clubs participated.  The association now has 2,386 teams and 1,055 referees affiliated and also has a staff of 13, who deal with all issues relating to governance and development of football within the county. In 1883, the staff consisted of a part-time honorary secretary.

The association opened its first rented office at 10 Tenters Terrace, Durham City, on 1 October 1913. In June 1923, it purchased Codeslaw, The Avenue, Durham City, to provide "an office, meeting rooms and residence for the secretary".  In 1971, the association moved to larger offices at The Sands, Durham City, which were officially opened by its then President, Arthur Askew. Owing to an increase in staff, another move was required and a custom-built suite of offices was erected at The Riverside, Chester-le-Street, which were officially opened on 9 June 2005 by the association's president, Frank Pattison, and the chairman of The Football Association, Geoffrey Thompson.

Development

Durham County FA supports clubs, leagues, and the education sector to up skill the football workforce to ensure, through engaging key partners, that high quality football experiences are available to all regardless of sex, race, disability, geographical location and playing ability.

Durham County FA continues to lead on core football development across the County and engages with external Football Development Officers to deliver a coordinated approach to increasing participation and raising standards. The strengthening of existing partnerships and the creation of new partnerships during 2008–2012 will enable the County FA to focus on its core football development work whilst broadening access through a collaborative approach.

Governance

The work of the Governance department involves the day-to-day running of the County Football Association. The main functions are to provide assistance and advice in all administration matters relating to leagues, cups, clubs, discipline, referees and answer any other general football related queries.

Affiliated Leagues

Men's Saturday Leagues
Wearside League
Crook and District League
Darlington Church and Friendly League
Durham Alliance League
Tyne and Wear Business Houses League
Wearside Combination League

Ladies and Girls Leagues
Durham County Women's League
Durham County Council Girls Mini Soccer League
Tyne Tees Girls Youth League

Men's Sunday Leagues
Consett and District Sunday League
Durham and District Sunday League
Darlington Sunday Morning Invitation League
Hartlepool Sunday League
Peterlee and District Sunday League
Spennymoor Sunday League
Stockton Sunday League
 Sunderland Sunday League
Wear Valley Sunday League

Other Leagues
Durham Emergency Services League  
Sunderland and District Sunderland Steels Social Club Over 40s League

Youth Leagues
Durham County Under 21s Saturday League
Durham County Under 18s League
Gateshead Youth League
Hartlepool Street League 
South Tyneside Youth League

Small Sided Leagues
Champion Soccer – Hartlepool (Monday) & (Thursday)
Champion Soccer – South Shields (Monday)
Power League – Gateshead
Sassco.co.uk 6-a-side League – Sunderland

Disbanded or Amalgamated Leagues

Leagues that were affiliated to the Durham County FA but have disbanded or amalgamated with other leagues include:
	 
Auckland and District League (also known as Bishop Auckland and District League)
Auckland and District Junior League
Barnard Castle and District League
Chester-le-Street and District League
Darlington Church & Friendly League
Darlington and District League
Darlington and District Sunday Morning League
Darlington Weekend League
Darlington Youth League
Durham Central League
Gaunless Valley League
Houghton and District League
Jarrow and District Junior League
Mid Durham League
Seaham and District League
South Durham League   	
Stanley and District League
Stanley and District Sunday League
Stockton League
Sunderland & District Nonconformist & Brotherhood League (now known as Wearside Combination League)
Washington and District League (known as the Durham Alliance League from 1996)

Affiliated Member Clubs

Among the notable clubs that are (or at one time were) affiliated to the Durham County FA are:

Billingham Synthonia
Billingham Town
Birtley Town
Bishop Auckland
Brandon United
Chester-le-Street Town
Cleator Moor Celtic
Cockfield (now defunct)
Consett
Craghead United (now defunct)
Crook Town
Darlington

Darlington Railway Athletic
Dunston Federation Brewery
Durham City
Easington Colliery
Esh Winning
Gateshead
Hartlepool United
Hebburn
Horden Colliery Welfare
Jarrow Roofing
Leadgate Park (now defunct)
Murton

Newton Aycliffe
Norton & Stockton Ancients
Peterlee Town
Prudhoe Town
Ryhope Colliery Welfare
Seaham Red Star
Shildon
South Shields
Spennymoor Town
Spennymoor United (now defunct)
Stockton (now defunct)

Sunderland
Sunderland Albion (now defunct)
Sunderland Nissan (now defunct)
Sunderland RCA
Tow Law Town
Washington
West Auckland Town
West Hartlepool (now defunct)
West Stanley (now defunct)
Whickham
Willington
Wolviston

County Cup Competitions

The Durham County FA run the following Cup Competitions:

Durham County Challenge Cup
Durham County Trophy Competition
Durham County Minor Cup Competition
Durham County Sunday Cup Competition

Durham County Under 18s Sunday Cup Competition
Durham County Bill Upsall Youth Minor Cup Competition
Durham County Under 14s Cup Competition
Durham County Tesco Under 13 Cup Competition

Durham County Under 12s Cup Competition
Durham County Women's County Cup Competition
Durham County Youth Cup Competition

Source

County Cup Winners

Source

Directors and Officials

Directors
F.D. Pattison
R. Strophair
J.R. Parker
P.Maguire
R.Coleman
G. Charlton
K. Clark
J. Sinclair
J.C. Topping

Key Officials
J.C. Topping (Company Secretary)
Mrs T. Lavery (Office Manager)
Chris Smith (County Development Manager)

References

External links
 Durham FA official website

County football associations
Football in County Durham
Sports organizations established in 1883